Depressa, population 1,541, is a village or small town in the Salento traditional region of south-east Italy. Administratively it counts as a frazione of the comune of Tricase, a municipality of the Province of Lecce, Apulia.

Transportation 
The nearest international airports are those of Brindisi and Bari. By road, Tricase can be reached by a 2-lane freeway from Bari.

References

See also 

 Lecce
 Magna Grecia
 Grecìa Salentina

Frazioni of the Province of Lecce
Localities of Salento
Tricase